Chak 95JB Gill (JB: Jhang Branch) is one of the big -sized village in Tehsil Gojra, District Toba Tek Singh in Pakistan. It is situated on Pensera Road and is connected to this road by a link road and bus stop here is known as Adda Korian.from graveyard to jutt kogria road . Chak 95JB is part of Union Council No.11 along with other chaks (villages) 97jb, 95jb gehri, 99jb 96jb,
Chak 95jb Gill located on ideal place that link to main Pensera Road, Anna Pakka road and Link with Canal along with train track as well. Chak 95 JB Gill extended to two new small villages named Odh Basti, Christine basti and having two graveyards, two schools,4 mosques,1 church  and all other basic facilities like clean water, Gase, electricity, roads and sanitation system. Majority of the village people are belong to agriculture and dairy businesses.
Two distinguish and famous village families are javedجاوید gujjar son of Noor Deenنور دین gujjar, Aslam gujjar اسلم گجّر  and miyan Bashir Ahmad jutt kogria میاں بشیرجٹ کوگریا  his sons ali fazal  jutt علی فاضل جٹ, Abdul Karim jutt kogria عبدالکریم جٹ کوگریا Abdul Karim'sons (grand sons of bashir ahmad)sons hafiZ wasim jutt kogria  حافظ وسیم جٹ کوگریا and kalim abbas jutt kogria کلیم عباس جٹ کوگریا  are known as main political families . kogria (miyan bashir ali fazal)  family and their party are known for village development as they manage to bring roads, clean water, sanitation system, play grounds and gase to the village and got high number of votes.
Chak 95 jb having multi cast village. Jutt are in majority. Gujjar rana Arain, Malik and Ansari cast also got in good number . Other respectabl personality of the village is master muhammad ashraf jutt known for village welfare and social worker.

Location
Chak 95JB Gill is Situated at 7.8 Km from Gojra and 40 Km from Faisalabad. Its neighboring villages include Chak 97JB, Chak 99JB and Chak 362JB.

Education
The village has two schools one for girls is known as Government Girls Community Model School 95JB and other Government Primary School 95JB is for boys. Many of the students travel Gojra or Chak 97JB for further schooling.

References

Populated places in Toba Tek Singh District